Losing Days is an EP released by Frank Turner on Sept. 1, 2013 via Xtra Mile. Losing Days was the third single from Turner's fourth studio album Tape Deck Heart. The other three songs on this EP were recorded during the Tape Deck Heart sessions.

Track listing

References

Frank Turner albums
2013 EPs